Saskatoon Co-operative Association Limited (commonly referred to as Saskatoon Co-op) is a retail cooperative. A member of Federated Co-operatives, it is headquartered in Saskatoon and has operations in the city and surrounding municipalities

Present operations

Saskatoon Co-op, which achieved sales of $503 million in 2021,  operates six retail food stores, four wine, spirits and beer stores, two home centres, one agro centre, 13 gas bars/convenience stores, 7 car washes and one hybrid store in Colonsay. Alongside Saskatoon, it has operations in Watrous, Colonsay, Dalmeny, Hepburn, Martensville, Rosthern, Waldheim, and Warman. The co-op has 109,000 members and 1,140 employees.

In 2013, Saskatoon Co-op opened Saskatoon's first private liquor store, occupying 10,000 square feet at Blairmore centre. It is one of the biggest liquor stores in the city.

In 2017, the Saskatchewan Rush of the National Lacrosse League reached a five-year sponsorship deal with Saskatoon Co-op, under which the team's venue is referred to as "Co-op Field at SaskTel Centre" during its games.

In November 2018, UFCW Local 1400 workers at Saskatoon Co-op went on strike over a proposed two-tier salary structure that would place newer employees on a lower pay grid. The union and Saskatoon Co-op reached an agreement in April 2019 that ended the strike.

In February 2019, Hepburn Co-op amalgamated into Saskatoon Co-op, expanding its operations to include Dalmeny, Hepburn, Rosthern, and Waldheim.

See also
List of Co-operative Federations
List of Canadian supermarkets

References

External links
Official Website

Companies based in Saskatoon
Consumers' co-operatives of Canada